Bath is a small village and a former municipality in the Dutch province of Zeeland, lying on the north shore of the Western Scheldt. It is now located in the municipality of Reimerswaal, about 10 km southwest of Bergen op Zoom.

History 
The village was first mentioned in 1325 as "insula de Boestenbare dicta". The current name refers to the Bad Creek (compare: bath).

According to the 19th-century historian A.J. van der Aa, the former village of Bath was hit by floods several times in the 16th century: in 1530, 1532, 1536 and 1539. After these floods, only the church tower of the village was left, but it too had disappeared by the 19th century. In 1773, a part of the area was reclaimed from the sea again, and a fort, Fort Bath, was built in 1785 to protect the ships who collected the toll for passing ships. A small hamlet was built inside the fort; this became the new village of Bath. The structure contained a square fort with three bastions surrounded by a moat. In 1809, it was destroyed by the English, and rebuilt between 1830 and 1834. In 1867, it was deemed obsolete.

Bath was home to 299 people in 1840. In 1950, a little church was built by the Free Evangelical Congregation. The village was flooded during the North Sea flood of 1953.

Bath was a separate municipality until 1878 (called "Fort Bath" until 1816), when it became a part of the municipality of Rilland-Bath.

Transportation
In 1872, the Rilland-Bath railway station was built on the Roosendaal to Vlissingen railway line.

Gallery

References

Populated places in Zeeland
Former municipalities of Zeeland
Reimerswaal (municipality)